Van Blarenberghe was the name of a dynasty of painters, originally from French Flanders (Lille), but some of the most famous descendants also lived in Paris, France. They were all descendants from Joris van Blarenberghe (1612–1670).

The first two painters were Hendrick van Blarenberghe (1646–1712) and his son Jacques-Guillaume van Blarenberghe (1679–1742). Their style was still heavily influenced by the Flemish Baroque style. Jacques-Guillaume had two painting sons, Louis-Nicolas van Blarenberghe (15 July 1716 – 1 May 1794) and Henri Désiré van Blarenberghe (1734–1812).

Louis-Nicolas had a son who was also a painter and with whom he often collaborated: Henri-Joseph van Blarenberghe (24 November 1750 – 1 December 1826). Together with his father they stayed at the Palace of Versailles, where they worked as miniaturists for the high society of their day. They were especially famous for their paintings on snuff boxes. Louis-Nicolas also worked as official campaign painter of the French court, following the French army as a war reporter. Two of his daughters, Catherine-Henriette and Isabelle, were chamber maids to the children of the French kings. The works of Louis-Nicolas and Henri-Joseph were collected in profusion in the 19th century by the Rothschild family. There is a collection of their work on public display at Waddesdon Manor. An enormous collection of Blarenberghe art was sold in the Mentmore Towers sale of 1977.

Henri-Joseph painted, besides the miniatures, mainly panoramic paintings, often in gouache. The subjects were, as with his father, often military, and also included the French revolution. He was the drawing teacher of the French princes, and founder and first conservator of the Palais des Beaux-Arts de Lille.

Gallery

External links 

 Exhibition about Henri-Joseph Van Blarenberghe at Musée du Louvre, Paris France (in French)
 Exhibition about Louis-Nicolas Van Blarenberghe at Versailles, France (in French)

17th-century French painters
French male painters
18th-century French painters
19th-century French painters
Landscape artists
Military art
19th-century French male artists
18th-century French male artists